Villadeati is a comune (municipality) in the Province of Alessandria in the Italian region Piedmont, located about  east of Turin and about  northwest of Alessandria.

Villadeati borders the following municipalities: Alfiano Natta, Murisengo, Odalengo Grande, Odalengo Piccolo, Montiglio Monferrato, and Tonco.

References

External links
 Official website

Cities and towns in Piedmont